Jiřina Petrovická (30 January 1923 – 10 October 2008) was a Czechoslovak film actress. She appeared in 20 films and television shows between 1943 and 1985.

Selected filmography
 Fourteen at the Table (1943)
 Men Without Wings (1946)
 Krakatit (1948)
 Getting on in the World (1948)
 The Secret of Blood (1953)

References

External links
 

1923 births
2008 deaths
Czech film actresses
People from Pardubice
Czech stage actresses